GCV may refer to:
 United States Navy good conduct variation
 Grand Cross of Valour, an honour of Rhodesia
 Gross calorific value
 Ground Combat Vehicle, a cancelled armored fighting vehicle design of the United States
  Generalized Cross Validation, a technique in statistics